Amira Benaïssa (born 19 December 1989) is an Algerian female tennis player.

Playing for Algeria in Fed Cup, Benaïssa has a win–loss record of 9–25.

ITF Circuit finals

Doubles: 2 (1–1)

ITF Junior Circuit finals

Singles (4–1)

Doubles (2–0)

External links
 
 
 

1989 births
Living people
Algerian female tennis players
Competitors at the 2018 Mediterranean Games
Mediterranean Games competitors for Algeria
21st-century Algerian women
20th-century Algerian women
Competitors at the 2022 Mediterranean Games